Shanghai Zhenhua Heavy Industries Company Limited is a Chinese state-owned multinational engineering company and the world's largest manufacturers of cranes and large steel structures. In 2015 the company accounted for about 75% of the world-market share for container cranes.

History
The company was founded in 1992. It is a wholly-owned subsidiary of China Communications Construction Company. ZPMC is listed on the Shanghai Stock Exchange. It specializes in designing, manufacturing, erecting, commissioning, shipping in fully erected state, after-sales servicing and developing new port machinery products. Its main products include container cranes (QCs) (supplied eight for London Gateway), rubber-tyred gantry cranes (RTGs), bulk-material ship loaders and unloaders, bucket-wheel stackers and reclaimers, portal cranes, floating cranes engineering vessels and large steel bridge structures. Its cranes are found in 120 large ports around the globe.

In 2009, the company rebranded itself as Shanghai Zhenhua Heavy Industries Co., Ltd.

In 2021, the Port of Piraeus received three ZPMC container cranes, doubling the lifting capabilities of the former container crane and equipped with a remote control system. 

In 2021, agents of the Federal Bureau of Investigation (FBI) believed to have discovered intelligence-gathering equipment on a cargo ship delivering ZPMC cranes to the Port of Baltimore. China saw the report as paranoid. Since the 2023 Chinese balloon incident, the ZPMC has come under further accusations by the Pentagon over their cranes suspected spying capabilities.

San Francisco–Oakland Bay Bridge
The company is the fabricator of the new Bay Bridge located in the San Francisco Bay Area in the USA. Although the company had no previous experience in bridge construction, California officials selected it based on the advantages of "huge steel fabrication facilities, its large low-cost work force and its solid finance."  The project employed 3,000 workers who built a main bridge tower and completed 28 bridge decks.

References

External links

 

Construction and civil engineering companies of China
Government-owned companies of China
Manufacturing companies based in Shanghai
Crane manufacturers
Chinese brands 
Chinese companies established in 1992
Construction and civil engineering companies established in 1992